The Shreveport Aftershock was a football team in the Independent Women's Football League based in Shreveport, Louisiana.  Home games were played at Independence Stadium.

Season-By-Season

|-
| colspan="6" align="center" | Shreveport Aftershock (IWFL)
|-
|2007 || 2 || 5 || 0 || 2nd West Midsouth || --
|-
|2008 || 4 || 4 || 0 || 2nd Tier II Midsouth || --
|-
|2009 || 2 || 4 || 0 || 15th Tier II || --
|-
!Totals || 8 || 13 || 0
|colspan="2"|

2009 season schedule

External links
 IWFL official website

Independent Women's Football League
Aftershock
Women's sports in Louisiana